St. Augustine's Catholic Church of Austin, Nevada, United States, located at 113 Virginia St., was built in 1866 and is Nevada's oldest Catholic church building.  It includes Gothic Revival and Italianate architecture.  It was extended by a c.1900 sacristy addition and was renovated in 1939.  It includes mural work from 1939 by Rafael Jolly and Duff Jolly, and an organ made by Henry C. Kilgen.

It was listed on the National Register of Historic Places in 2003.

References 

Roman Catholic churches completed in 1886
Roman Catholic churches in Nevada
Gothic Revival church buildings in Nevada
Italianate architecture in Nevada
Churches in Lander County, Nevada
Churches on the National Register of Historic Places in Nevada
National Register of Historic Places in Lander County, Nevada
19th-century Roman Catholic church buildings in the United States
Austin, Nevada
Italianate church buildings in the United States